{{DISPLAYTITLE:C24H38O4}}
The molecular formula C24H38O4 (molar mass: 390.55 g/mol) may refer to:

 Bis(2-ethylhexyl) phthalate (dioctyl phthalate)
 Dioctyl terephthalate

Molecular formulas